Louie Gong (born August 8, 1974) is a Canadian American visual artist, activist, public speaker, educator, and entrepreneur. His work focuses on Indigenous and multiracial identity, exploring race and identity through art, and expanding business leadership and capacity for Native artists.

Early life and education 

Gong was born in Ruskin, British Columbia and is Native American (Nooksack), Chinese, French and Scottish. He was raised by his grandparents, father and stepmother in Ruskin, B.C. and later in the Nooksack tribal community in Washington State.

Gong graduated from Western Washington University with a master's degree in school counseling and worked as a child and family therapist, first with youth from his own tribal community in the public school system. He later became a school counselor in the North Kitsap School District before moving into higher education at the University of Washington and administration at Muckleshoot Tribal College. Gong has been an independent artist and entrepreneur since 2012.

Career

Art 

Gong is the founder of the company Eighth Generation, through which he merges traditional Coast Salish art and icons from popular culture to make statements about identity. He also launched the Inspired Natives Project , with the motto "Support Inspired Natives, not Native-inspired", in 2014 to model respectful ways of aligning with Native artists, aesthetics, and culture—while building the capacity of emerging Native arts entrepreneurs. His first artist collaboration under the Inspired Natives Project was with Acoma Pueblo artist Michelle Lowden, followed by a collaboration with Anishinaabe artist and organizer Sarah Agaton Howes.

In 2011, Gong collaborated with Manitobah Mukluks to design the "LG Gatherer", a limited edition boot that sold out of numerous production runs. Louie has also collaborated with Paul Frank Industries on an original design for tote bags, pillows and blankets. In 2012, Gong partnered with the Smithsonian Institution's National Museum of the American Indian (NMAI) to explore issues of identity, community and mixed heritage through "Design Yourself: IAMNMAI" workshops, using his customizable art toy, Mockups. Gong was named to Native Max Magazine's list of "Top 10 Inspirational: Natives Past and Present".

Gong has also exhibited at or had artistic partnerships with the Seattle Art Museum, the Wing Luke Museum of the Asian Pacific American Experience,
and the DePaul Art Museum.

Activism 

Gong's activism about social and political issues affecting Native and mixed race people has been featured in media such as The New York Times, NBC Nightly News and MSNBC.com, Native Peoples Magazine, Native Max Magazine, and the Indian Country Today Media Network.

Gong was Board President of the Mavin Foundation, a national non-profit organization that raises awareness about mixed race people and families, from 2007 to 2009. He was a co-developer of the Mixed Heritage Center.

Films 

Gong's merging of art and activism has been the subject of UNRESERVED: the Work of Louie Gong, a Longhouse Media film that screened at film festivals including Festival De Cannes and National Geographic's All Roads Film Festival, and Schuhe Machen Leute, a 2013 documentary produced in Germany.

References

External links 
 Eighth Generation
 UNRESERVED: The work of Louie Gong (film)

1974 births
Living people
21st-century American businesspeople
21st-century Native Americans
American activists
American textile industry businesspeople
Canadian activists
First Nations artists
Nooksack